Kallikattu Pallikoodam is a Tamil soap opera that aired on Vijay TV. The show premiered on 19 October 2009. It aired Monday through Thursday at 7:30PM IST. The show director and written by Jerold. The show last aired on 6 May 2010 and ended with 126 episodes.

Plot
Kallikaatu Pallikoodam is a village school based Tamil serial with a story of a School and its student in a village in Theni district. The story is based on a school named Kumaraguruparar School  where they mainly teach the students Discipline and Education.

Cast
 Senthil Kumar as Bala Murugan, Principal of Theni Kumaraguruparar School
 Bala Saravanan
 Venkatesh
 Black Pandi
 Patmanathan
 Sathriyan
 Anandhi
 Srivithiya
 Ganesh Kumar

References

External links
Official website
Star Vijay on Youtube
Star Vijay US
Star Vijay Malaysia

Star Vijay original programming
Tamil-language school television series
Tamil-language teen television series
Tamil-language romance television series
2009 Tamil-language television series debuts
Tamil-language television shows
2010 Tamil-language television series endings